Riverside Township is one of thirteen townships in Fremont County, Iowa, United States.  As of the 2010 census, its population was 313 and it contained 150 housing units.

Geography

Cities, towns, villages
 Randolph

Cemeteries
The township contains Duff Cemetery, Randolph Cemetery and Riverside Cemetery.

School districts
 Farragut Community School District
 Fremont-Mills Community School District
 Sidney Community School District

Political districts
 Iowa's 3rd congressional district
 State House District 23
 State Senate District 12

References

External links
 City-Data.com

Townships in Iowa
Townships in Fremont County, Iowa